"Nastradamus" is the first single from Nas' fourth album Nastradamus. It was produced by L.E.S. The song contains the lyrics "You wanna ball 'til you fall, I can help you with that" which were viewed as a jab at Rocafella artist Memphis Bleek, sparking the beef which would eventually involve Jay-Z. The music video was originally released in 3-D with Tower Records providing "Nastradamus" 3-D glasses as a tie in (this was the first ever Music Video to use the 3-D technology, wrongly credited to the 2008 Missy Elliott video "Ching-A-Ling"). Nas debuted the video with Carson Daly on MTV's TRL in November 1999. The beat uses the sample "The Monorail Express" by the J.B.'s, the same one EPMD used on their song "Let the Funk Flow" from their 1988 album Strictly Business. A music video directed by Jeff Byrd was released too.

Track listing

A-side
 "Nastradamus" (Album version) (4:13) 
 "Nastradamus" (Clean version) (4:13) 
 "Nastradamus" (Instrumental) (4:13)

B-side
 "Shoot 'Em Up" (Album version) (2:56)
Produced by Havoc
 "Shoot 'Em Up" (Clean version) (2:56)
 "Shoot 'Em Up" (Instrumental) (2:51)

Chart positions
#92 (U.S. Hot 100)
#27 (U.S. R&B)
#4 (U.S. Rap)
#24 (UK)

1999 singles
Nas songs
Song recordings produced by L.E.S. (record producer)
Songs written by Nas
1999 songs
Columbia Records singles